Liuguanghe Bridge is a  beam bridge at Liu Guangzhen, Guizhou, China. It held the record for world's highest bridge between 2001 and 2003, surpassing the 72-year-old,  Royal Gorge Bridge, until the opening of the  Beipan River Guanxing Highway Bridge. , it is still the highest beam bridge and is among the twenty highest bridges in the world.

The Liuguanghe Bridge forms part of China National Highway 321 between Bijie and Guiyang and has a  span. The highest pillar, which sits on the edge of a steep, deep valley, is 90 metres high.

See also
List of highest bridges in the world

References

Bridges in Guizhou
Bridges completed in 2001